Thomas McCormack (February 21, 1873 - August 17, 1949) was a lawmaker from California who served in the California State Senate for the 5th district from 1929 to 1933 and the 15th district from 1933 to 1949. He was born in Canada.

References

20th-century American politicians
1873 births
1949 deaths
Republican Party California state senators